The National Stallion Stakes was an American Thoroughbred horse race held sixty-two times between 1898 and 1971. Inaugurated as the National Stallion Race at Morris Park Racecourse in The Bronx, the event was open to horses of either sex until 1948 when it became a race exclusively for colts and geldings and a National Stallion Stakes (filly division) was created. Contested on dirt at a distance of five furlongs, from 1905 onward it was hosted by Belmont Park in Elmont, New York except for 1963 through 1967 when it was run at Aqueduct Racetrack in South Ozone Park, Queens, New York.

The race was restricted to horses whose sire had been nominated for the race by its owner before the end of the foal's birth year.

Historical notes 
The inaugural running of the National Stallion race took place on May 14, 1898 at Morris Park Racecourse and was won by Jean Bereaud who would go on to win the next year's Belmont Stakes.

In his 1907 win, future Hall of Fame inductee Colin set a new track record of 58 seconds flat for five furlongs on dirt.

Hal Price Headley's Jet Master set a new track and North American record in 1951 of 55 4/5 seconds for five furlongs on dirt.

On June 10, 1953, then forty-year-old future Hall of Fame inductee Charlie Whittingham saddled his first stakes winner when Liz Person's Porterhouse won the National Stallion Stakes.

Filly winners 1898–1947 
In what would be the last year for racing at Morris Park Racecourse, in 1904 Tanya became the first filly to win the National Stallion Stakes during the time it was open to horses of either sex. Tanya went on to become just the second filly to ever win the Belmont Stakes, an American Classic that would eventually be the third leg of the U.S. Triple Crown series. It would be thirty-four years until another filly was victorious in the National Stallion Stakes when New York City restaurateur Henry Lustig's Donita M won the 1938 race. Five years later Henry Lustig would own the third filly to capture the race when in 1943 his Mrs. Ames defeated the gelding Stir Up owned by the powerful Greentree Stable. Sonny Whitney's Enfilade in 1945 was the last filly to win the National Stallion Stakes before the separate division was created.

Owners who won both divisions in the same year 
1961: Christopher Chenery's Meadow Stable won the colt division with Sir Gaylord and the filly division with their future Hall of Fame inductee  Cicada.

1964: Wheatley Stable, owned by Gladys Mills Phipps and her brother Ogden L. Mills, won the colt division with Bold Lad and the filly division with Queen Empress.

1971: Calumet Farm won the colt division with Plum Bold and the filly division with Rondeau in what would prove to be the final running of the National Stallion races.

Racing shutdown 
The 1908 passage of the Hart–Agnew anti-betting legislation by the New York Legislature under Republican Governor Charles Evans Hughes threatened the survival of horse racing in the state. In spite of strong opposition by prominent owners such as August Belmont Jr. and Harry Payne Whitney, reform legislators were not happy when they learned that betting was still going on at racetracks between individuals and they had further restrictive legislation passed by the New York Legislature in 1910. The Agnew–Perkins Law, a series of four bills and recorded as the Executive Liability Act, made it possible for racetrack owners and members of its board of directors to be fined and imprisoned if anyone was found betting, even privately, anywhere on their premises.  After a 1911 amendment to the law that would limit the liability of owners and directors was defeated in the Legislature, every racetrack in New York State shut down Owners, whose horses of racing age had nowhere to go, began sending them, their trainers and their jockeys to race in England, France and other countries in Europe. Many horses ended their racing careers there and a number remained to become an important part of the European horse breeding industry. Thoroughbred Times reported that  more than 1,500 American horses were sent overseas between 1908 and 1913 and of them at least 24 were either past, present, or future Champions. A February 21, 1913 ruling by the New York Supreme Court, Appellate Division saw horse racing return in 1913. However, the number of quality stallions in the United States had diminished to such an extent that it would take several years to get back to normal. The National Stallion Stakes would not be run again until 1926.

Records 
Speed record:
 0:57.40 @ 5 furlongs: Skin Deep (1939)
 1:04.00 @ 5.5 furlongs: Timbeau (1963)

Most wins by a jockey:
 7 – Eddie Arcaro (1941, 1950, 1951, 1952, 1955, 1957, 1958)

Most wins by a trainer:
 3 – James G. Rowe Sr. (1907, 1909, 1927)

Most wins by an owner:
 4 – Cornelius Vanderbilt Whitney (1930, 1932, 1937, 1945)

Winners 

 † Due to a "blinding rainstorm", in 1908 there was no time taken.

References 

Discontinued horse races in New York (state)
Flat horse races for two-year-olds
Flat horse races for two-year-old fillies
Recurring sporting events established in 1898
Recurring sporting events disestablished in 1970
1898 establishments in New York City
1971 disestablishments in New York (state)
Sports in the Bronx
Sports in Queens, New York